Gerald Penn is a clinical immunologist, and a pioneer in the field of clinical immunoelectrophoresis. He was a student of Henry Kunkel at Rockefeller University from 1968 to 1970, and holds both an M.D. and Ph.D. from the Ohio State University. His research also includes one of the earliest studies on the negative effects of naturally occurring stressors on the response of the human immune system. He is a clinical associate professor of pathology at the Ohio State University.

External links
 Penn G and Batya J (1978) Interpretation of Clinical Immunophoretic Patterns,  Educational Products Division, American Society of Clinical Pathologists, Chicago.
 Kiecolt-Glaser JK, Garner W, Speicher C, Penn GM, Holliday J, Glaser R. Psychosocial modifiers of immunocompetence in medical students.  Psychosomatic Medicine 1984 46(1): 7-14.

Rockefeller University alumni
Living people
Year of birth missing (living people)
Ohio State University College of Medicine alumni
Ohio State University faculty
American biochemists